

Films

References

LGBT
1996 in LGBT history
1996